Aesculus pavia, known as red buckeye or firecracker plant (formerly Pavia rubra), is a species of deciduous flowering plant. The small tree or shrub is native to the southern and eastern parts of the United States, found from Illinois to Virginia in the north and from Texas to Florida in the south. It is hardy far to the north of its native range, with successful cultivation poleward to Arboretum Mustila in Finland.

It has a number of local names, such as scarlet buckeye, woolly buckeye and firecracker plant.

Description 
The red buckeye is a large shrub or small tree. It bears  clusters of attractive dark red tubular flowers in the spring. The flowers are hermaphrodite.

The flowers are attractive to hummingbirds as well as bees.

Varieties 
There are two varieties:
Aesculus pavia var. pavia: typical red buckeye.
Aesculus pavia var. flavescens: yellow-flowered red buckeye.

The yellow-flowered variety, var. flavescens, is found in higher country in Texas, and hybrids with intermediate flower color occur.

Ornamental cultivars, such as the low-growing 'Humilis', have been selected for garden use.

Hybrids 
Red buckeye has hybridized with common horse-chestnut (Aesculus hippocastanum) in cultivation, the hybrid being named Aesculus × carnea, red horse-chestnut. It is a popular tree in large gardens and parks, most commonly the selected cultivar 'Briotii'. Hybrids of red buckeye with yellow buckeye (A. flava) have also been found, and named Aesculus × hybrida.

Uses 
The fruits are rich in saponins, which are poisonous to humans, although not particularly dangerous because they are not ingested easily. The seeds are poisonous. The oils can be extracted to make soap, although this is not viable commercially.

Gallery

References

External links 
 photo of Yellow Red Buckeye
 Aesculus pavia images at bioimages.vanderbilt.edu

pavia
Trees of the Plains-Midwest (United States)
Trees of the North-Central United States
Trees of the Southern United States
Trees of the Southeastern United States
Trees of the South-Central United States
Trees of the United States
Plants described in 1753
Taxa named by Carl Linnaeus
Trees of the Great Lakes region (North America)